Globe FM (98.5 MHz) is a radio station located in Bauchi State, Nigeria. It is part of the Federal Radio Corporation of Nigeria national state-owned network. It launched on 29 July 2003 as part of a 36-station expansion of the FRCN network.

In 2021, new 10 kW transmitters were installed at Globe FM and 11 other FRCN stations.

References 

Radio stations in Nigeria
2003 establishments in Nigeria
Radio stations established in 2003